The Church of the Flight into Egypt (Maltese: Il-kappella tal-Ħarba lejn l-Eġittu) is a Roman Catholic church located at the Valletta Waterfront in Floriana, Malta. The church was built in the 18th-century on the baroque design of Andrea Belli for spiritual service of the workers at the Pinto Stores. The church was hit by aerial bombardment in World War II in 1941 and it was then restored in 1989 but it remained unconsecrated. It was opened for church service again in 2006 together with the Valletta Waterfront. The current rector is Paul Attard.

History
The church is the only one in the country dedicated to the Flight into Egypt. The chapel was built during the reign of Grand Master Manuel Pinto da Fonseca in the 1750s. It was used by departing and arriving sailors. The design for the baroque church is attributed to architect Andrea Belli. Even though the church is small, the architect made sure to include all characteristics that a bigger church would have such as two bell towers and cupola. An inscription above the door reads:

The inscription includes a Roman number 1752, the year the church was dedicated. Above the inscription there is the coat of arms of Grand Master Pinto adorned by an imperial crown. The church which was extensively damaged during an air raid on 16 January 1941, but it was restored in 1989. The chapel was inaugurated on July 28, 2006 as part of the Valletta Waterfront project.

Interior
The titular painting above the high altar depicts the flight of the Holy Family into Egypt. The painting depicts the Virgin Mary, with baby Jesus in her hands, resting under the shade of a palm tree, while on their way to Egypt. St Joseph is portrayed pulling his donkey to have some shade while some angels are shown looking over the Holy Family. The interior walls are richly decorated with sculptures, making the church a rich example of baroque architecture.

See also

Culture of Malta
History of Malta
List of Churches in Malta
Religion in Malta

References

18th-century Roman Catholic church buildings in Malta
Floriana
Churches completed in 1752
Baroque church buildings in Malta